This is a list of schools in the City of Gold Coast in Queensland, Australia. Prior to 2015, the Queensland education system consisted of primary schools, which accommodated students from kindergarten to Year 7 (ages 5–13), and high schools, which accommodate students from Years 8 to 12 (ages 12–18). However, from 2015, Year 7 became the first year of high school.

State schools

State primary schools

State high schools and colleges (government schools)

Other state schools 

This includes special schools (schools for children with disabilities) and schools for specific purposes.

Defunct state schools

Private schools

Catholic schools
In Queensland, Catholic primary schools are usually (but not always) linked to a parish. Prior to the 1970s, most schools were founded by religious institutes, but with the decrease in membership of these institutes, together with major reforms inside the church, lay teachers and administrators began to take over the schools, a process which completed by approximately 1990. Brisbane Catholic Education (BCE), headquartered in Dutton Park, was established in 1993 and is responsible for coordinating administration, curriculum and policy across the Catholic school system. Preference for enrolment is given to Catholic students from the parish or local area, although non-Catholic students are admitted if room is available.

Independent schools

Defunct private schools

See also
List of schools in Queensland
List of schools in Greater Brisbane
List of schools in Northern Rivers and Mid North Coast (for Tweed Shire)

References

External links
, a directory of Government schools in Queensland. (Department of Education and Training – Queensland Government)
Find a School, at Catholic Education Office of the Archdiocese of Brisbane.
About Independent schools at Independent Schools Queensland.
Queensland Schools Public Holidays List

Gold Coast
 
Gold Coast, Queensland-related lists